Ilie Savel (25 August 1927 – 16 December 2015) was a Romanian hurdler. He competed in the men's 400 metres hurdles at the 1956 Summer Olympics.

References

1927 births
2015 deaths
Athletes (track and field) at the 1956 Summer Olympics
Romanian male hurdlers
Olympic athletes of Romania
Place of birth missing